Lynn Anke Hannie Wilms (born 3 October 2000) is a Dutch professional footballer who plays as a right-back or a centre-back for Frauen-Bundesliga club VfL Wolfsburg and the Netherlands national team.

Club career
Wilms played for CTO-Zuid. In 2018, she moved to FC Twente in the Eredivisie. During the 2018–19 season, she was a starting defender in all 24 matches and scored two goals. FC Twente finished in second place during the regular season with a  record. Wilms helped the club win the Eredivisie championship.

International career
At the age of 18, Wilms made her debut for the Dutch national team in the European Championship qualifier against Turkey which the Netherlands won 3–0 on 3 September 2019. She scored her first international goal in a 3–3 draw against France on 10 March 2020 during the 2020 Tournoi de France.

Career statistics

International

Scores and results list Netherlands' goal tally first, score column indicates score after each Wilms goal.

References

External links
 
 
 

2000 births
Living people
People from Tegelen
Dutch women's footballers
Netherlands women's international footballers
Eredivisie (women) players
FC Twente (women) players
Women's association football defenders
Footballers at the 2020 Summer Olympics
Olympic footballers of the Netherlands
VfL Wolfsburg (women) players
UEFA Women's Euro 2022 players
Frauen-Bundesliga players
Footballers from Limburg (Netherlands)
Dutch expatriate sportspeople in Germany
Dutch expatriate women's footballers
Expatriate women's footballers in Germany